Ambila is a town and commune in Madagascar. It belongs to the district of Manakara, which is a part of Vatovavy-Fitovinany Region. The population of the commune was estimated to be approximately 17,000 in 2001 commune census.

Only primary schooling is available. Farming and raising livestock provides employment for 40% and 37% of the working population. The most important crop is rice, while other important products are lychee and cassava. Services provide employment for 3% of the population. Additionally fishing employs 20% of the population.

Geography
It lies at the Fianarantsoa-Côte Est railway and the RN 12 that link the town with Fianarantsoa and Manakara.

References and notes 

Populated places in Vatovavy-Fitovinany